The Museum of Power is located in the former Southend Waterworks (now Essex and Suffolk Water) Langford Pumping Station in Langford, Essex, England. It is on the B1019, on the main road from Maldon to Hatfield Peverel.

The museum operates the Langford and Beeleigh Miniature Railway, which offers passenger rides around the museum, as well as Astaria, the only model village in Essex. The museum hosts major events such as the Easter Transport Fest, Classic Vehicle & Vintage Show, American Car Show, and Bike Meet, which see a large array of visiting vintage cars, motorbikes, and American and custom vehicles on display. It is also the home of Essex's major steampunk event, which takes place every September.

History
Langford Pumping Station was built by T and C Hawksley in 1924, and opened in 1927. It continued pumping fresh (treated) water using steam engines until 1963, when electric pumps took over. It is designed to extract water from the Rivers Chelmer, Ter, and Blackwater. The three inflows merge in a small settling reservoir, where sediment is naturally deposited, and then pumped for treatment, and again to a storage reservoir. Two of the three engines and the boilers and coaling plant were scrapped in 1963, and the octagonal chimney was demolished.

One engine 'Marshall' and pump set has been preserved and thanks to efforts from the museum's volunteers were brought back to steam in 2011. The museum runs 10 steam days annually, which are part of the many events (examples listed above). The engine, built by the Lilleshall Company of Oakengates in Shropshire, is a triple-expansion steam engine built in 1931 and numbered 282. Museum research shows that 'Marshall' is the last triple-expansion engine to be built by the Lilleshall Company and is the only one of its kind in the UK still in its original location, with its original pump sets. When operating on steam, 'Marshall' could be unique worldwide, but this cannot be proved.

The pump house buildings and the remaining engine were declared Scheduled Ancient Monuments in 1986 and also received engineering heritage listed status from the Institution of Mechanical Engineers in 2012 as a result of the return to steam.

Address
Steam Pumping Station
Hatfield Road
Langford, Maldon
Essex, CM9 6QA

See also
 Internal Fire Museum of Power, a museum of internal combustion engines in West Wales
 Prickwillow Museum
 Stretham Old Engine
 Cambridge Museum of Technology

References

External links
 
 Astaria Model Village at the Museum of Power
 Langford and Beeleigh Miniature Railway at the Museum of Power

Industry museums in England
Museums in Essex
Scheduled monuments in Essex
Steam museums in England
Preserved stationary steam engines